Hypocacia is a genus of longhorn beetles of the subfamily Lamiinae, containing the following species:

 Hypocacia biplagiata Breuning, 1935
 Hypocacia shimomurai Holzschuh, 1989

References

Mesosini